Virginija is a Lithuanian feminine given name. People bearing the name Virginija include:
Virginija Juršienė (born 1950), Lithuanian ceramic artist.
Virginija Kalinauskaitė (born 1957), Lithuanian graphic artist

References

Lithuanian feminine given names